Quitaraju or Kitaraju (possibly from Ancash Quechua kita dam, Quechua rahu snow, ice) is a mountain in the Cordillera Blanca in the Andes of Peru, about  high. It is situated in the Ancash Region, Huaylas Province, Santa Cruz District. Quitaraju lies north of the Santa Cruz Creek and the lakes named Ichiccocha, Jatuncocha and Quitacocha, between Santa Cruz in the west and Alpamayo in the northeast. Its slopes are within the Huascarán National Park.

Elevation 
Other data from available digital elevation models: SRTM 6010 metres, ASTER filled 6010 metres and TanDEM-X 5961 metres. The height of the nearest key col is 3253 meters, leading to a topographic prominence of 2783 meters. Quitaraju is considered a Mountain Sub-System according to the Dominance System  and its dominance is 46.11%. Its parent peak is Nevado Santa Cruz and the Topographic isolation is 4.9 kilometers.

First Ascent 
Quitaraju was first climbed by Arnold Awerzger and Erwin Schneider (Austria) June 17, 1936.

External links 

 Elevation information about Quitaraju
 Weather Forecast at Quitaraju

References

Mountains of Peru
Mountains of Ancash Region
Six-thousanders of the Andes